Marvin Hamilton-Omole (born 8 October 1988), commonly known as Marvin Hamilton, is a professional footballer who plays as a midfielder for Hythe Town. Born in England, he represents the Sri Lanka national team.

Hamilton began his career with Gillingham and has subsequently gone on to play for a number of non-League clubs in the south of England, as well as spending brief spells playing in Cyprus, Australia and the USA.

Career

Club career
After junior trials with Arsenal, Hamilton also played for Waltham Forest and Ridgeway Rovers before joining Gillingham as a youth player in July 2005. He signed as a professional on a one-year contract on the eve of the 2007–08 season and made his first-team debut as a substitute in an away defeat to Luton Town on 25 August 2007. After a change of manager and a loan spell at Folkestone Invicta, he was released by Gillingham on 31 March 2008  and joined Dover Athletic. Hamilton started the 2008–09 season as a trialist at AFC Wimbledon and Lincoln City before signing for Cypriot side APEP in January 2010. Hamilton played for Hemel Hempstead Town and then joined Conference South club Eastbourne Borough on 24 February 2012.

Hamilton then had a brief spell playing in Australia, first in the Victoria Premier for Southern Stars (now known as Dingley Stars) before moving in the July 2013 transfer window to Albany Creek in the Brisbane Premier League. After a trial at Chelmsford City, Hamilton joined Isthmian League club Ware, where he scored the league goal of the month in April 2014.

Hamilton returned to The Sports for the 2014–15 season  before being released in February 2015 and signing for Whitehawk until the end of the season. After a spell playing in the US, Hamilton signed briefly for Dartford on 6 August 2015  and then Isthmian League side VCD Athletic before re-joining Eastbourne Borough for the third time on 30 October.

Hamilton then re-signed for Whitehawk for the start of the 2016–17 season.

He re-signed for Whitehawk for the start of the 2019–20 season but announced he was leaving at the end of the curtailed 2020–21 season, to pursue opportunities in Sri Lanka.

In September 2022, Hamilton signed for Hythe Town.

International career
Hamilton was eligible to represent England, Nigeria and Sri Lanka. He was first called up to the Sri Lankan national team, for which he qualifies through his mother, on 7 May 2019. This was for the upcoming FIFA World Cup Qatar 2022 & AFC Asian Cup 2023 Preliminary Joint Qualification Round 1. However, he could not make it to the Sri Lankan squad at that time due to certain formalities and procedures being uncompleted.  He played in a friendly warmup match against Qatar in 2018.

In May 2021, he received a call-up from the Football Federation of Sri Lanka to play in the 2022 FIFA World Cup qualifiers against Lebanon and South Korea. He made his senior international debut on 5 June 2021, in a 3–2 defeat against Lebanon. Then on 4 October, Hamilton scored his first goal against Nepal in a 3–2 defeat at the 2021 SAFF Championship.

International goals

References

External links

1988 births
Living people
People from Leytonstone
Sri Lankan footballers
Sri Lanka international footballers
English footballers
Sri Lankan expatriate footballers
Sri Lankan people of Nigerian descent
English people of Nigerian descent
English people of Sri Lankan descent
Association football defenders
Gillingham F.C. players
Folkestone Invicta F.C. players
Dover Athletic F.C. players
APEP FC players
Hemel Hempstead Town F.C. players
Eastbourne Borough F.C. players
Albany Creek Excelsior FC players
Whitehawk F.C. players
Dartford F.C. players
VCD Athletic F.C. players
Margate F.C. players
Ware F.C. players
Haringey Borough F.C. players
Burgess Hill Town F.C. players
Sittingbourne F.C. players
Hythe Town F.C. players
English Football League players
Cypriot First Division players
Expatriate footballers in Cyprus
National League (English football) players